Defending champion Boris Becker defeated Ivan Lendl in the final, 6–4, 6–3, 7–5 to win the gentlemen's singles tennis title at the 1986 Wimbledon Championships.

Seeds

  Ivan Lendl (final)
  Mats Wilander (fourth round)
  Jimmy Connors (first round)
  Boris Becker (champion)
  Stefan Edberg (third round)
  Joakim Nyström (third round)
  Henri Leconte (semifinals)
  Anders Järryd (second round)
  Andrés Gómez (first round)
  Tim Mayotte (quarterfinals)
  Kevin Curren (first round)
  Brad Gilbert (fourth round)
  Mikael Pernfors (fourth round)
  Martín Jaite (second round)
  Guillermo Vilas (first round)
  Johan Kriek (second round)

Qualifying

Draw

Finals

Top half

Section 1

Section 2

Section 3

Section 4

Bottom half

Section 5

Section 6

Section 7

Section 8

References

External links

 1986 Wimbledon Championships – Men's draws and results at the International Tennis Federation

Men's Singles
Wimbledon Championship by year – Men's singles